Microzaena is a genus of beetles in the family Carabidae, containing the following species:

 Microzaena angustior Alluaud, 1935
 Microzaena chrysomeloides Basilewsky, 1979
 Microzaena levis Alluaud, 1935
 Microzaena madecassa Fairmaire, 1901

References

Paussinae